Michou (Saint-Denis, Réunion, 9 August 1960) is a Réunion singer. Daughter of the Réunionnais composer Narmine Ducap, she had her first séga hit in 1972 at the age of 12. After a long career, and many hit singles, with various bands she issued solo albums in the 1990s.

Discography 
Singles:

 Viens dors dans mon dos ; Séga klaxon ; Route en corniche ; Papa Noël, AS AS3010 (accompagnement : Narmine Ducap & Max Dormeuil).
 Larobée ; Crasé salle verte, Jackman J40118 (accompagnement : Les Dièses).
 Garde moi ; P'tit l'ambiance, Jackman J40268.
 Cafrine ; La Rake mon bon Dieu ; Ti planteur la Réunion ; Séga samedi soir, Issa I15016.
 Ca un affaire ça ; L'Amour y fait mal, Issa I4051 (accompagnement : Les Dièses).
 Bouscule, bouscule pas ; Femme à pic, Issa I4054 (accompagnement : Les Dièses).
 Carnaval la plaine ; Toi ma petite île, Issa I4072, 1976 (accompagnement : Les Dièses).
 Michou ; Zordi ton fête maman, Issa I4094, 1976
 Un Crasé longtemps ; Régime télé couleur, Issa I6013 (accompagnement : Les Soul Men).
 Cyclone cyclone arrête ; Jamais na kité, Issa I6014 (accompagnement : Les Soul Men).
 Vivre sans toi jamais ; Ti pays regretté, Issa I6034 (accompagnement : Les Soul Men).
 Mam'zelle Paula ; Vive la pluie, Royal DR770001, 1978.
 Maloya ton tisane ; Mariage Fanny, Royal DR770010.
 Largu' la sauce ; Tombé levé, Royal DR770018, 1978 (accompagnement : Les Caméléons).
 Maloya bibi ; Mi vois bébête, Royal DR770060, 1979.
 Bougr' libertin ; Maximin mon coco, Piros P5031, 1980.
 Toine, Antoine ; Pays kalou, Piros P5044.
 Crédo vidéo ; Grillé l'année, Piros P5090.
 Solo maloya ; Roi gamère, Piros P5102.
 Clotilde ; Cœur fané, 102FM 102P8703, 1987.

Albums:

 Tombé levé, Royal DR770019, 1978 (accompagnement : Les Caméléons).
Purgatoire créole, Piros, 1991.
Piments bien forts, Sonodisc, 1998.
Fantaisie créole, Piros, 1999.
Best of, Discorama, 2005.
Sandragon 2008
Michou - 35 Ans Séga, 2CD 2012

References

1960 births
Living people
People from Saint-Denis, Réunion
20th-century French women singers
21st-century French women singers
Réunionnais singers